The 2017 NCAA Division I Cross Country Championships was the 79th annual NCAA Men's Division I Cross Country Championship and the 37th annual NCAA Women's Division I Cross Country Championship to determine the team and individual national champions of NCAA Division I men's and women's collegiate cross country running in the United States. In all, four different titles will be contested: men's and women's individual and team championships.

Held on November 18, 2017, the combined meet was hosted by the University of Louisville at E. P. "Tom" Sawyer State Park in Louisville, Kentucky. The distance for the men's race was 10 kilometers (6.21 miles) while the distance for the women's race was 6 kilometers (3.73 miles).

Women's title
Distance: 6,000 meters
(DC) = Defending champions

Women's Team Result (Top 10)

Women's Individual Result (Top 10)

Men's title
Distance: 10,000 meters
(DC) = Defending champions

Men's Team Result (Top 10)

Men's Individual Result (Top 10)

See also
 NCAA Men's Division II Cross Country Championship 
 NCAA Women's Division II Cross Country Championship 
 NCAA Men's Division III Cross Country Championship 
 NCAA Women's Division III Cross Country Championship

References
 

NCAA Cross Country Championships
NCAA Division I Cross Country Championships
NCAA Division I Cross Country Championships
Sports competitions in Louisville, Kentucky
Track and field in Kentucky
NCAA Division I Cross Country Championships
University of Louisville